Paul Robeson High School can refer to:
 Paul Robeson High School (Illinois), school in Chicago, USA
 Paul Robeson High School for Business and Technology, school in New York City, USA
 Paul Robeson High School for Human Services, school in Philadelphia, USA